Stephen Louis Armstrong Dillard (born November 13, 1969 in Nashville, Tennessee) is an appellate court judge and lecturer. In 2010, he was appointed to fill a vacant judgeship on the Georgia Court of Appeals. In 2012, he was elected to a full six-year term and was re-elected in 2018. His current term will end in 2024.

Education 

Dillard graduated from Samford University and the Mississippi College School of Law, cum laude.

Career 

In 1996, he was admitted to practice in Georgia, and he is an active member of the State Bar of Georgia. Dillard clerked for Judge Daniel Anthony Manion of the United States Court of Appeals for the Seventh Circuit.

Dillard practiced appellate law with the Macon, Georgia law firm of James, Bates, Pope & Spivey LLP until receiving his judgeship appointment in 2010. He lives in Macon with his wife, the former Krista McDaniel, and their three children. On June 1, 2009, Dillard was nominated to fill a vacancy on the Supreme Court of Georgia.

On July 1, 2009, Georgia Governor Sonny Perdue's Office of Communications announced that the Georgia Judicial Nominating Commission had recommended Dillard as one of nine individuals to fill that vacancy. But in August 2009, Governor Perdue appointed Dillard instead to the Judicial Nominating Commission. In October 2010, Perdue appointed Dillard to fill one of two vacancies on the Georgia Court of Appeals. His judicial appointment ran from November 1, 2010 through December 31, 2012.

On July 31, 2012, Judge Dillard was elected by his fellow Georgians to serve a full six-year term on the Court (2013–18). On July 1, 2017, Dillard was elected by his colleagues to serve as the Court’s Chief Judge. Since joining the Court of Appeals, Dillard has spoken to numerous organizations and participated in countless seminars on a wide variety of legal topics. In 2016, Judge Dillard was appointed as the Co-Chairperson of the Georgia Judicial Council's Strategic Plan Standing Committee, and as a member of the Council's Standing Committee on Technology.

In 2015, Dillard was appointed by Governor Nathan Deal to the Georgia Appellate Jurisdiction Review Commission. He was appointed that year to serve on the Georgia Judicial Council, and as the Chairperson of the Council's Court Reporting Matters Committee. In 2014, he was named the "State Judge of the Year" by his alma mater, the Mississippi College School of Law, for outstanding judicial service and also received the "Fastcase 50" award, which honors leaders in the world of law, scholarship, and legal technology.

In 2013, he was awarded the Distinguished Judicial Service Award by the Young Lawyers Division of the State Bar of Georgia, recognizing his outstanding service on the bench and commitment to improving the practice of law. In 2012, Judge Dillard was appointed to the Code of Judicial Conduct Review Committee, and he also began serving as the Special Consultant to the Georgia High School Mock Trial Committee.

Personal 

Dillard is married to Krista (née McDaniel), with whom he has three children.

Electoral history 

2012

2018

Bibliography 
 Five essays in the Encyclopedia of Civil Liberties in America, (M.E. Sharpe, 2005)
 Griffin Bell and Antonin Scalia biographies in Great American Judges, (ABC-CLIO, 2003); and
 Kenneth Starr and Joseph Story biographies in Great American Lawyers, (ABC-CLIO, 2001)

References

External links 

|-

1969 births
Living people
20th-century American lawyers
21st-century American lawyers
21st-century American judges
American alternative journalists
American bloggers
Federalist Society members
Georgia Court of Appeals judges
Georgia (U.S. state) lawyers
Mississippi College School of Law alumni
People from Macon, Georgia
People from Nashville, Tennessee
Samford University alumni
State attorneys
21st-century American non-fiction writers